Manolis Bertos (born 13 May 1989) is a Greek professional footballer who last played proffesionally as a right-back for Super League 2 club AEL.

Career 
Manolis Bertos played all his professional career in Skoda Xanthi. During the seven years he had 131 appearances in all competitions. He was among the starting XI in the final of the 2014–15 Greek Football Cup where his club lost 3–1 from Olympiacos.

On 8 August 2015, he signed a three years' contract with Greek giants Olympiacos. It remains to be seen whether Bertos will join Olympiacos for the 2015–16 season, or if he will stay on loan for another year in his former club Skoda Xanthi. The first scenario would probably activated if Omar Elabdellaoui will sign to Benfica. Eventually he did not manage to earn the confidence of Olympiacos coach, he signed a two years' contract with Asteras Tripolis, leaving the champions without earning a single appearance.

On 7 September 2018, he joined AEL, on a two-year contract. 

On 27 June 2020, Bertos signed a two-year contract renewal.

Career statistics

Club

Honours
Greek Football Cup
 Runners-up (1): 2014–15

References

External links
Insports profile 

1989 births
Living people
Olympiacos F.C. players
Xanthi F.C. players
Asteras Tripolis F.C. players
Athlitiki Enosi Larissa F.C. players
Super League Greece players
Greek footballers
Footballers from Xanthi
Association football fullbacks